One in the Sun is credited as the only solo album by Steve Gaines, best known as a guitarist for Lynyrd Skynyrd. It was recorded with Crawdad band mates at Leon Russell's Church Studio in Tulsa, Oklahoma, and at Capricorn studios in Macon, Georgia, in 1975. It was released in 1988 by MCA Records, 11 years after Gaines' death in the 1977 Lynyrd Skynyrd plane crash.  Crawdad had been a working band for some time and all the material had been performed onstage prior to being recorded.  Gaines had previously worked with all the members of Crawdad in other bands, some of which included Magic Kitchen, Man Alive, and Detroit.

Track listing
All songs written by Gaines, except where noted.
"Give It to Get It" – 4:45
"It's Alright" (Curtis Mayfield) – 3:04
"Blackjack Davey" (Traditional, arr. Taj Mahal) – 2:40
"On the Road" (John Moss) – 2:47
"One in the Sun" – 4:49
"Talkin' About Love" (Gaines, Moss) – 4:07
"Nothin' Is New" – 2:41
"Take My Time" – 4:28
"Summertime's Here" – 5:28

Personnel
Crawdad
Steve Gaines – lead vocals, lead guitar, backing vocals
John 'Moose' Moss – guitar, backing vocals, lead vocal on "On the Road"
Terry Emery – keyboards
John Seaberg – bass, backing vocals, tuba on "Blackjack Davey"
Ron 'Brooksie' Brooks – drums, percussion

Additional personnel
Bruce Blain – 	keyboards, programming
Mark Dearnley – remixing
Greg Fulginiti – mastering
Tommy Lokey – horn
Charles 'Chip' Miller – congas
John Ryan – producer
Sam Whiteside – producer

References

1988 albums
Steve Gaines albums
MCA Records albums